Christopher Robin Duesterdiek is a Canadian Production sound mixer. He is best known for his work on The Snow Walker (2003), Elysium (2013), The Interview (2014) and The Revenant  (2015).

In 2016, he received an Academy Award for Best Sound Mixing nomination at the 88th Academy Awards for his work on The Revenant.

Filmography
 
  2015: The Revenant (production sound mixer)  
  2014: Night at the Museum: Secret of the Tomb (sound mixer)  
  2014: Seventh Son (sound mixer)  
  2014: The Interview (sound mixer)  
  2014: Big Eyes (sound mixer)  
  2013: Elysium (sound mixer: second unit, Canada)  
  2013: Motive (production sound mixer  11 episodes)  
  2012: The Company You Keep (sound mixer)  
  2012: This Means War (production sound mixer)  
  2012: Underworld: Awakening (production sound mixer)  
  2012: This American Housewife (production sound mixer  1 episode)  
  2010: The Wyoming Story (TV Movie) (sound mixer)  
  2010: November Christmas (TV Movie) (production sound mixer)  
  2010: Marmaduke (production sound mixer)  
  2010: Human Target (sound mixer  11 episodes)  
  2010: Tucker and Dale vs. Evil (sound mixer)  
  2009: The Farm (production sound mixer)  
  2009: Damage (sound mixer)  
  2009: The Vampire Diaries (production sound mixer  1 episode)  
  2006-2009: Kyle XY (production sound mixer  39 episodes)  
  2008: Samurai Girl (production sound mixer  1 episode)  
  2008: Stone of Destiny (location sound mixer)  
  2008: Sleepwalking (sound mixer)  
  2007: Psych (sound mixer  7 episodes)  
  2006: Fido (production sound mixer)  
  2005-2006: Da Vinci's City Hall (TV Series) (production sound mixer  13 episodes)  
  2005: Terminal City  (TV Series) (production sound mixer  10 episodes)  
  2005: Virtuality (Short) (sound mixer)  
  2005: Stargate SG-1 (TV Series) (sound mixer  1 episode)  
  2004: The Keeper (location sound mixer)  
  2004: Cold Squad (TV Series) (production sound mixer  6 episodes)  
  2004: Chestnut: Hero of Central Park (production sound mixer)  
  2004: Going the Distance (production sound mixer)  
  2004: Stargate: Atlantis (TV Series) (sound mixer  1 episode)  
  2004: 5ive Days to Midnight (TV Mini-Series) (sound mixer)  
  2003: The Snow Walker (location sound mixer)  
  2003: A Date with Darkness: The Trial and Capture of Andrew Luster (TV Movie) (sound mixer)  
  2002: No Night Is Too Long (TV Movie) (sound mixer)  
  2002: Deadly Little Secrets (sound mixer: second unit)  
  2002: Hellraiser: Hellseeker (Video) (sound mixer)  
  2002: The Mangler 2 (Video) (sound mixer)   
  2000: The Magician's House II (TV Short) (sound mixer)  
  2000: Dark Angel (production sound mixer: second unit)  
  2000: Andromeda (TV Series) (sound mixer: second unit)  
  2000: Just Deal (TV Series) (production sound mixer)

Awards and nominations

References

External links
 

Living people
Best Sound BAFTA Award winners
Canadian sound designers
Canadian sound editors
Year of birth missing (living people)